"Little Things" is a song by Australian recording artist Jessica Mauboy. It was released digitally on 21 June 2019 as the second single from Mauboy's fourth studio album, Hilda.

Upon released, Mauboy explained "This song is everything we want to tell our loved ones... to remind them that all we want is to be loved and appreciated in all of the things we do." adding "This song could also be felt in a way that you could be an eight year old girl or boy and want to feel loved by your parents, trying to catch their attention when your parents aren't watching, to a 20 year old sharing their deepest experience and not getting that back in return from the one they love, (or) to a 50 year old who could has lost their loved one and is haunted by memories of what was unsaid."

She further wrote on her Instagram that "Little Things" "holds a special place in my heart".

At the ARIA Music Awards of 2019, the song was nominated for two awards ARIA Award for Best Female Artist and ARIA Award for Best Video.

At the APRA Music Awards of 2020, the song was shortlisted for Song of the Year.

Reception
Lauren from Sounds of Oz said "It's intimate and powerful, with an emotional maturity that's so compelling" saying "[it] may be her best work yet."

Music video
The music video for "Little Things" was released on 31 July 2019. Shot in one continuous take, Mauboy breaks down in tears during the video and said "I'm really proud of this video; it's me at my rawest and I can’t wait to see everyone’s reaction to it."

Track listing

Charts

Weekly charts

Year-end charts

Certifications

Release history

References

2019 songs
2019 singles
Jessica Mauboy songs
Songs written by Jessica Mauboy
Songs written by David Musumeci
Songs written by Anthony Egizii
Sony Music Australia singles